Bolsheshukshanovo (Olo Şuqşan) is a rural locality (a village) in Vanyshevsky Selsoviet, Burayevsky District, Bashkortostan, Russia. The population was 188 as of 2010. There are 3 streets.

Geography 
Bolsheshukshanovo is located 19 km northeast of Burayevo (the district's administrative centre) by road. Kutliyarovo is the nearest rural locality.

References 

Rural localities in Burayevsky District